Pinnacle Foods, Inc., is a packaged foods company headquartered in Parsippany, New Jersey, that specializes in shelf-stable and frozen foods. The company became a subsidiary of Conagra Brands on October 26, 2018.

History
The company was founded in 1998 as "Vlasic Foods International", acquiring the Swanson TV dinners, Open Pit, and Vlasic Pickles brands from the Campbell Soup Company. Between 2001 and 2007 the spinoff of former Campbell Soup Company branded food lines was owned by the Metropoulos Group which named it Pinnacle Foods.

In 2007, Pinnacle Foods was acquired by the Blackstone Group, a New York City-based private equity firm.

In 2013, Pinnacle Foods' Parsippany office was named Inc. Magazine's "World's Coolest Office." That year, Pinnacle Foods had its IPO on the New York Stock Exchange, raising approximately $580 million for its owners, the private equity Blackstone Group. Shares began trading under the ticker symbol PF on April 4 at the upper range of its offering, $20 per share, thereby valuing Pinnacle Foods with a market capitalization of $2.3 billion.

In May 2014, Hillshire Brands announced it was buying Pinnacle Foods for $4.23 billion in a cash and stock deal. Hillshire Brands' portfolio includes Jimmy Dean, Ball Park, and Sara Lee. But on June 30, 2014, it was announced that Pinnacle Foods had scrapped its sale to Hillshire Brands, which would allow Hillshire Brands to be acquired by Tyson Foods. Pinnacle was to receive a $163 million payment as part of the breakup from Hillshire, and also receive an expected $25 million in one-time costs connected to the scotched sale.

In March 2016, it was announced that CEO Robert Gamgort would be leaving Pinnacle Foods to be the new CEO of Keurig Green Mountain. Mark A. Clouse, formerly of Mondelēz, succeeded Gamgort as CEO of the company.

In June 2018, Conagra announced it would acquire Pinnacle Foods for $8.1 billion. The sale was completed on October 26, 2018 and the company was delisted in the NYSE.

Other acquisitions
In March 2004, Pinnacle Foods acquired Aurora Foods of St. Louis, Missouri. Two years later, it acquired the food business of Dial Corporation including the Armour Star canned meats business.

In 2009, the Swanson brand was discontinued in the United States, but remained in use in Canada. That same year, Pinnacle Foods also acquired Birds Eye Foods, Inc. adding a mix of frozen and specialty brands to its portfolio.

In November 2014, Pinnacle Foods announced that it would acquire Garden Protein International, Inc., maker of Gardein, from founder Yves Potvin, for $154 million.

In November 2015, Pinnacle Foods announced that it would be acquiring Boulder Brands for around $710 million, as part of the company's strategy to expand its health and wellness services.

Brands

Grocery
Armour Star (acquired from The Dial Corporation in 2006)
Appian Way Pizza Crust Mix (acquired from The Dial Corporation in 2006)
Banner Sausage (acquired from The Dial Corporation in 2006)
Bernstein's dressings
Brooks beans and chili
Cream Cornstarch (acquired from The Dial Corporation in 2006)
Duncan Hines including Duncan Hines Comstock, Duncan Hines Wilderness (acquired from Procter & Gamble in 1997)
Log Cabin Syrup (acquired from Kraft Foods)
Milwaukee's Pickles
Mrs. Butterworth's (acquired from Unilever)
Nalley
Open Pit barbecue sauce
Smart Balance
Vlasic
Wish-Bone (acquired from Unilever in 2013)

Frozen
Birds Eye including Birds Eye C&W and Birds Eye Voila!
Celeste
Hungry-Man frozen TV dinners (acquired from Campbell Soup Company)
Lender's (acquired from Kraft Foods in 1999)
Mrs. Paul's
Van de Kamp's

Boulder
Earth Balance
EVOL
Gardein
Glutino
Udi's

Specialty
El Restaurante
Erin's
Hawaiian Kettle Style Potato Chips and Snack Rings
Husman's
Snyder of Berlin (no longer related to Snyder's of Hanover)
Tim's Cascade Snacks

Former

Frozen
Aunt Jemima frozen breakfast foods, produced continuously under license from Quaker Oats beginning in 1996 under Aurora Foods until discontinuation of the entire lineup in 2017 soon after a voluntary product recall over potential listeria contamination.

References

External links

 
Conagra Brands
American companies established in 1998
Baking mixes
Companies based in Camden County, New Jersey
Cherry Hill, New Jersey
2007 mergers and acquisitions
2013 initial public offerings
2018 mergers and acquisitions
Food and drink companies established in 1998
Food product brands
Condiment companies of the United States
Companies formerly listed on the New York Stock Exchange